The Redwillow River is a tributary of the Wapiti River in northern Alberta and north-eastern British Columbia, Canada. It flows through the Pouce Coupe Prairie, in the south of Peace River Country.

Course
A campground is established on the shore of Stony lake immediately west of the river origin, and is accessible through local roads south of the Heritage Highway.

It flows east between Lone Mountain and Squaw Mountain, where it receives the waters from Rat Lake and other mountainside creeks. South Redwillow River is a right tributary that also brings water from Quicksand Lake. After draining Little Prairie Lakes, it continues east and receives water from Thunder Creek and Hiding Creek.

The Redwillow River becomes meandered as it progresses east and north-east into the province of Alberta. It continues through prairie land and receives water from Lattice Creek and further east from Diamond Dick Creek as it passes between the communities of Rio Grande, Sylvester and Elmworth.

Tributaries
In British Columbia
Rat Lake
South Redwillow River
Little Prairie Lakes
Thunder Creek
Hiding Creek

In Alberta
Lattice Creek
Diamond Dick Creek
Beaverlodge River

See also
List of British Columbia rivers
List of Alberta rivers

References

Rivers of Alberta
Rivers of British Columbia
Peace River Country